Thornett is a surname. Notable people with the surname include:

Alan Thornett (born 1937), British Trotskyist leader
Dick Thornett (1940–2011), one of five Australians to have represented their country in three sports
Jan Thornett, married name of Jan Andrew (born 1943), Australian butterfly swimmer and Olympic medallist
John Thornett (1935–2019), Australian rugby union player
Ken Thornett (born 1937), Australian rugby league footballer

See also
Thorne (disambiguation)
Thorner
Thorney (disambiguation)
Tornat